Ocean is the sixth album released by the German rock band Eloy. It is a concept album based on the mythical City of Atlantis and its doom and sinking, intended as a warning to humanity (alluding to the Cold War). It was released in 1977 and is considered their finest album –  a classic of the genre in Germany. 

It sold 200,000 copies on the German charts.

Track listing
All songs written by Eloy. Lyrics by Rosenthal.
Side One
 "Poseidon's Creation" - 11:38
 "Incarnation of the Logos" - 8:25
Side Two
"Decay of the Logos" - 8:15
 "Atlantis' Agony at June 5th - 8498, 13 P.M. Gregorian Earthtime" - 15:35

Personnel
Frank Bornemann - Electric, acoustic and processed guitars, lead vocals
Klaus-Peter Matziol - Gibson Thunderbird and Fender Fretless basses, backing vocals
Detlev Schmidtchen - Mini-Moog and ARP synthesizers, Mellotron, RMI keyboard computer, angelic voices, Hammond organ, xylophone
Jürgen Rosenthal - SONOR Genuine Rosewood drums, voice, PAiSTe cymbals, timbales, REMO Roto-Toms, temple blocks, kettle drums, tubular bells, morse key, triangles, paper, flute

Production
Arranged and produced by Eloy
Engineered by Georgi Nedeitschev

References

1977 albums
Eloy (band) albums